The following is a partial list of spa towns in Poland.

See also

 List of spa towns
 Tourism in Poland

References

External links

 Thermal springs and spas in Poland
 Health-Spa Tourism in Poland 

 
Spa towns
Poland